Kilkabyzovo (Kilkabıź) is a rural locality (a selo) in Starokuruchevsky Selsoviet, Bakalinsky District, Bashkortostan, Russia. The population was 358 in 2010. There are eight streets.

Geography 
Starokuruchevo is the nearest rural locality.

References 

Rural localities in Bakalinsky District